Bongers or Bonger is a Dutch toponymic surname akin to modern Dutch boomgaards ("from the orchard") and is thereby equivalent to Bogaert and van den Boogaard.

People with this surname include:

Bongers
Bart Bongers (born 1946), Dutch water polo player

Bram Bongers (1926–1980), Dutch magician known as "Fred Kaps"
Els Bongers (born ca. 1970), Dutch soprano
Gert Bongers (born 1948), Dutch track cyclist
H. Bongers (1873–1940), photographer of Borobudur in Java

Bonger
Andries Bonger (1861–1936), Dutch art collector, brother of Johanna
Johanna van Gogh-Bonger (1862–1925), wife of Theo van Gogh and keyplayer in the growth of Vincent van Gogh's fame
 (1876–1940), Dutch criminologist

References

Dutch-language surnames